is a railway station in Tosu, Saga, Japan, operated by Kyushu Railway Company (JR Kyushu). The station opened on March 12, 2011. The name of the station was officially announced by JR Kyushu on December 17, 2010.

Lines

Shin-Tosu Station is served by the Kyushu Shinkansen, and is proposed to form the junction with the Nishi Kyushu Shinkansen to Nagasaki in the future. The Nagasaki Main Line platforms are accessible through a separate set of ticket gates across from the Shinkansen gates.

Station layout

The Shinkansen station consists of two elevated island platforms serving four tracks. The conventional line has two side platforms.

See also
 List of railway stations in Japan

References

Railway stations in Saga Prefecture
Railway stations in Japan opened in 2011